Absolute Return for Kids (ARK), is an international children's educational charity based in London, UK.

Ark is a registered charity under English law. In its reporting year 2017–18, excluding its few subsidiaries, it saw gross income of £14.66 million and had 42 employees.

Ark is the parent organisation of Ark Schools, a separate legal entity that is a multi-academy trust in the English education system, with 39 schools (as of 14 October 2022) and nearly 30,000 pupils.

History
Ark was founded in 2002 by a group of hedge fund financiers including Paul Marshall and Ian Wace of Marshall Wace – and Arpad Busson of EIM Group, founding chairman of the charity's board of trustees.

Its aim is to invest philanthropy (benevolence, gift-giving) to improve, greatly, the life chances of children. Since 2014, the charity has been known as Ark or ARK.

Its charitable objects are: "to make sure that all children, regardless of their background, have access to a great education and real choices in life. ark incubates, launches and scales ventures that share our mission and values."

Activities
Ark operates in the UK, South Africa, Zimbabwe and India. In the US, it is affiliated to Absolute Return for Kids US, Inc. (Ark US), a US philanthropic organisation which shares Ark's mission, and which supports the work of Ark through grants.

Ark works in education, health and child protection.

Schools
In England, its subsidiary Ark Schools is a multi-academy trust responsible for the schools that Ark runs which, typical of its class, has exempt charity status since 2011.)

Ark Schools was created in 2004 to work with the Department for Education and local authorities to create new schools for inner cities through the academies programme. Its aim is to help close the achievement gap between children from disadvantaged and more affluent backgrounds. Its academies focus on raising attainment with the aim of every pupil going into higher education when they complete school. The schools are frequently held up by the government as an example of a successful multi-academy trust, where at least seven others were failing. Ofsted chief inspector Sir Michael Wilshaw stepped down in 2016 and was replaced by Amanda Spielman, the founder of Ark Schools and an accountant.

As of 2019, Ark runs 36 schools in the English education system, and plans to grow further. It has been, by a sector analyst of a periodical, criticised or seen as unusual for a record of running some schools, as at before 2020 at a deficit, relying on internal loans.

In 2022, the Birmingham school Ark Kings Academy was given a funding warning after being found inadequate during an Ofsted inspection.
The Ofsted report, published in May 2022, following an inspection in February 2022, said: "Some pupils, particularly those who identify as LGBT, experience repeated name-calling and prejudiced behaviour. This means that pupils do not feel safe in the school."

List of Ark schools in England

Primary schools

Ark Atwood Primary Academy, Westminster
Ark Ayrton Primary Academy, Portsmouth‡
Ark Bentworth Primary Academy, Hammersmith & Fulham
Ark Blacklands Primary Academy, Hastings‡
Ark Brunel Primary Academy, Kensington and Chelsea
Ark Byron Primary Academy, Ealing
Ark Castledown Primary Academy, Hastings‡
Ark Conway Primary Academy, Hammersmith & Fulham
Ark Dickens Primary Academy, Portsmouth‡
Ark Franklin Primary Academy, Brent
Ark John Archer Primary Academy, Wandsworth
Ark Little Ridge Primary Academy, Hastings‡
Ark Oval Primary Academy, Croydon
Ark Priory Primary Academy, Ealing
Ark Swift Primary Academy, Hammersmith & Fulham
Ark Tindal Primary Academy, Birmingham‡

Secondary schools

Ark Acton Academy, Acton, Ealing
Ark Alexandra Academy, Hastings‡
Ark All Saints Academy, Southwark
Ark Blake Academy, Croydon
Ark Bolingbroke Academy, Wandsworth
Ark Boulton Academy, Birmingham‡
Ark Charter Academy, Portsmouth‡
Ark Elvin Academy, Wembley, Brent
Ark Evelyn Grace Academy, Lambeth
Ark Greenwich Free School, Greenwich
Ark Pioneer Academy, Barnet
Ark Putney Academy, Wandsworth
Ark St Alban's Academy, Birmingham‡
Ark Soane Academy, Acton, Ealing
Ark Walworth Academy, Southwark

All-through schools

Ark Academy, Brent
Ark Burlington Danes Academy, Hammersmith & Fulham
Ark Globe Academy, Southwark
Ark Isaac Newton Academy, Redbridge
Ark John Keats Academy, Enfield
Ark King Solomon Academy, Westminster
Ark Kings Academy, Birmingham‡
Ark Victoria Academy, Birmingham‡

Boards of Trustees
As of November 2018 the Ark Schools trustees are Ian Wace (Chairman), Lord Fink, Sir Paul Marshall, Anthony Williams and Anthony Clake.

Arpad Busson sits on the global board and is chairman of Absolute Return for Kids, US, Inc.

See also
List of charitable foundations

References

External links
 Ark website
 Ark schools website

Educational charities based in the United Kingdom
 
Organizations established in 2002
2002 establishments in England
Charities based in London
Founders of English schools and colleges
Multi-academy trusts